Spiral similarity is a plane transformation in mathematics composed of a rotation and a dilation. It is used widely in Euclidean geometry to facilitate the proofs of many theorems and other results in geometry, especially in mathematical competitions and Olympiads. Though the origin of this idea is not known, it was documented in 1967 by Coxeter in his book Geometry Revisited.

The following theorem is important for the Euclidian plane:
Any two directly similar figures are related either by a translation or by a spiral similarity. 
(Hint: Directly similar figures are similar and have the same orientation)

Definition 
A spiral similarity  is composed of a rotation of the plane followed a dilation about a center  with coordinates  in the plane. Expressing the rotation by a linear transformation  and the dilation as multiplying by a scale factor , a point  gets mapped to

On the complex plane, any spiral similarity can be expressed in the form , where  is a complex number. The magnitude  is the dilation factor of the spiral similarity, and the argument  is the angle of rotation.

Properties

Center of a spiral similarity for two line segments 

Through a dilation of a line, rotation, and translation, any line segment can be mapped into any other through the series of plane transformations. We can find the center of the spiral similarity through the following construction: 

The circumcircles intersect at a second point . Then  is the spiral center mapping  to 

Thus, . Similarly, .

Solution with complex numbers  

Pairs of spiral similarities 

This can be seen through the above construction. Therefore, . Also,  implies that . So, by SAS similarity, we see that .

Corollaries

Proof of Miquel's Quadrilateral Theorem 

Example problem 

Proof: We first prove the following claims:

Claim 1: Quadrilateral  is cyclic. 

Proof: Since  is isosceles, we note that  thus proving that quadrilateral  is cyclic, as desired. By symmetry, we can prove that quadrilateral  is cyclic.

Claim 2: 

Proof: We have that  By similar reasoning,  so by AA similarity,  as desired. 

References

Euclidean geometry